Mailer is a surname. Notable people with the surname include:

Dee Jay Mailer (21st century), educator
John Buffalo Mailer (born 1978), author, playwright and journalist
Kate Mailer (born 1962), American stage and film actress
Michael Mailer (born 1964), film producer
Norman Mailer (1923–2007), American novelist, journalist, essayist, poet, playwright, screenwriter, and film director
Ron Mailer (born 1932), Scottish footballer
Susan Mailer (born 1949), American psychoanalyst
Stephen Mailer (born 1966), American stage and screen actor

See also
Lee B. Mailler (1898–1967), New York politician